The Qatar Cycling Federation (in Arabic: الاتحاد القطري للدراجات الهوائية) is the national governing body of cycle racing in Qatar. It was officially founded in 2002. Mohammed Jaham Al-Kuwari was its president as of April 2017.

It is a member of the UCI and the Asian Cycling Confederation.

References

External links
 Qatar Cycling Federation official website

National members of the Asian Cycling Confederation
Cycle racing organizations
Cycling
Cycle racing in Qatar